Vallariopsis is a genus of flowering plants in the family Apocynaceae, first described as a genus in 1936. It contains only one known species, Vallariopsis lancifolia, native to Peninsular Malaysia, Borneo, and Sumatra.

References

Monotypic Apocynaceae genera
Flora of Malesia
Apocyneae